× Rhynchovanda, abbreviated Rhv. in the horticultural trade, is the nothogenus for intergeneric hybrids between the orchid genera Rhynchostylis and Vanda (Rhy. x V.).

References

Orchid nothogenera
Aeridinae